Ammu Joseph (born 26 September 1953) is a journalist, author, media analyst and editorial consultant based in Bangalore, India. Ammu writes primarily on issues relating to gender, human development, the media and culture. She writes for a number of mainstream publications and web-based media.

Education 
Joseph received her B.A. in English literature from Women's Christian College, Chennai in 1974, a diploma in Social Communications Media from Sophia College Polytechnic in Mumbai in 1975, and a B.S. in Public Communications from Syracuse University, New York City in 1976. She has also been a press fellow at Wolfson College, Cambridge University, England.

Career
Joseph began her career as a journalist with Eve's Weekly, which she served as Assistant Editor for four years (1977–81). She later worked with Update (a business magazine) and Woman Today (a women's magazine the India Today planned to launch but did not). In her last full-time job within the press, she was Magazine Editor of The Indian Post in Mumbai, editing the Sunday magazine of the daily newspaper. In 1988 she took a decision to move to Bangalore and continue her work as a freelance/independent journalist and writer.

Works 

Joseph has published the following books:

 Whose News? The Media and Women's Issues 
 Women in Journalism: Making News (co-authored with Kalpana Sharma)
 Storylines: Conversations with Women Writers (Women Unlimited, 2003)
 Just Between Us: Women Speak about their Writing (Women Unlimited, 2004)
 Interior Decoration: Poems by 54 Women in 10 Languages
 Terror, Counter-Terror: Women Speak Out (Women Unlimited, 2003) 

Other recent publications she has been associated with are: Re / Shaping Cultural Policies (UNESCO, 2015 and 2018); Inside the News: Challenges and Aspirations of Women Journalists in Asia and the Pacific (UNESCO/UN Women, 2015); Media and Gender: A Scholarly Agenda for a Global Alliance (UNESCO/IAMCR, 2014); The Palgrave International Handbook of Women and Journalism (Palgrave Macmillan, 2013); the Learning Resource Kit to Strengthen Gender-Ethical Journalism (WACC/IFJ, 2012); The Media in South Asia (South Asian Journal 38, 2012); Missing Half the Story: Journalism as if Gender Matters (Zubaan, 2010);  Tsunami 2004:  Communication Perspectives (Hampton Press, 2010).  She also contributed to UNESCO's World Trends in the State of Freedom of Expression and Media Development (2014) and Gender Sensitive Indicators for Media (2012).

Joseph served as Coordinator – India for the Global Media Monitoring Project (2010 and 2015) and Coordinator – South Asia for the Global Report on Women in the News Media (2011).

She was among the principal drafters of UNESCO’s Gender Sensitive Indicators for Media. 

She played a key role in the pioneering project that led to the 2020 report on the situation of women working in the film industries of southern India, Shift Focus: Women Shaping the Narrative in Media and Entertainment.

She has taught journalism at several institutions of media education. She was on the visiting faculty of the Sophia College Polytechnic, Mumbai (1981–85), the Asian College of Journalism, Chennai/Madras (2000–2003) and the Convergence Institute of Media, Management & Information Technology, Bangalore, besides being invited to deliver guest lectures at a number of other J-schools across the country. At the ACJ she conceptualised and taught a course on Covering Gender; at COMMITS she taught a course on Covering Development.

She was an editorial consultant with the Concerned for Working Children, Bangalore, helping to launch a wallpaper for street and working children, among other publications. She was also editorial consultant for Voices for Change, a quarterly publication of Voices/Madhyam Communications, a Bangalore-based NGO focusing on communications in and for development. She served on the board of Oxfam India, a not-for-profit organization registered in India, for nine years, up to 2020. 

She contributes to a number of mainstream publications and web-based media. She also wrote a fortnightly column on current affairs and social issues for children in The Hindu's Young World supplement for eight years in the 1990s under the pseudonym Uma. 

She is a founder-member of the Network of Women in Media, India, and co-editor of its website.

Awards
Joseph was awarded the Donna Allen Award for Feminist Advocacy by the Commission on the Status of Women of the Association for Education in Journalism and Mass Communication, USA, in 2003. In 2007, Joseph received the UNFPA-LAADLI Media Award for Gender Sensitivity in recognition of her consistent engagement with gender issues.

Selected publications

"Voices Unheard" series of articles in India Together 2004–2014 https://indiatogether.org/columns/voices-unheard

Some among several articles published in The Hoot http://asu.thehoot.org/author/ammu-joseph

Articles published in Money Control https://www.moneycontrol.com/author/ammu-joseph-10301/

Articles published in Deccan Herald https://www.deccanherald.com/author/ammu-joseph

Articles published in The News Minute  https://www.thenewsminute.com/author-articles/Ammu-Joseph 

Articles published in the Economic & Political Weekly https://subscription.epw.in/author/ammu-joseph 

Articles published in Nieman Reports https://niemanreports.org/authors/ammu-joseph/ 

Articles published in Citizen Matters https://bengaluru.citizenmatters.in/author/ammujoseph 

The Media Circus:  Where's the Ringmaster? The Citizen 4 July 2022 https://www.thecitizen.in/sponsored/the-media-circus-wheres-the-ringmaster-286821

Media Regulation is not Censorship The Citizen 25 September 2020 https://www.thecitizen.in/index.php/en/NewsDetail/index/4/19415/Media-Regulation-is-not-Censorship--

Skeletons in Media Cupboards The Citizen 5 July 2020 https://www.thecitizen.in/index.php/en/NewsDetail/index/4/19003/Skeletons-in-Media-Cupboards

Molestation in Bangalore:  How many is 'mass'? 18 January 2017 https://sabrangindia.in/content-authors/ammu-joseph

Sexual Harassment in the Media – Felt Need Frontline 27 December 2013 https://frontline.thehindu.com/social-issues/felt-need/article5443758.ece

Feminism Remixed VERVE (http://www.verveonline.com/), Volume 16, Issue 6, June 2008 Available here:  http://ultraviolet.in/2008/07/07/feminism-remixed-an-article-by-ammu-joseph/

Out of Step – Women in/and the media Seminar 2001 https://india-seminar.com/2001/505/505%20ammu%20joseph.htm

A walk down memory lane (reminiscences of writing the Spaced Out column in The Hindu's Young World for 8 years under a pseudonym) https://www.thehindu.com/features/kids/A-walk-down-memory-lane/article10217440.ece

Some Interviews

Past changes and current trends on gender equality in the news media: interview with Ammu Joseph 6 December 2021 https://www.alignplatform.org/resources/past-changes-and-current-trends-gender-equality-news-media-interview-ammu-joseph 

In Conversation With Ammu Joseph: The #MeToo In Media Moment 6 November 2019 https://feminisminindia.com/2019/11/06/ammu-joseph-metoo-media-moment/

Media should not remain content to be the opiate of the masses Journalism Online 2014 Available here:  https://nwmindia.org/features/newsmakers-profiles/interview-with-ammu-joseph-on-winning-donna-allen-award-for-feminist-advocacy/ 

Champion for Indian Women in Media Women's E-News 1 January 2004 https://womensenews.org/2004/01/ammu-joseph-champion-indian-women-media/

References 

1953 births
Indian newspaper editors
Living people